Linda S. Sanford (born 1953) is an American technology executive. She worked at IBM prior to her retirement on December 31, 2014, where she was the senior vice president of Enterprise Transformation. Her previous positions at IBM included senior vice president and group executive in the company's Storage Systems Group and general manager of the S/390 Division. She was inducted into the Women in Technology Hall of Fame in 1996. She was elected a member of the National Academy of Engineering in 1997 for computer product development including transformation from hierarchical mainframes to more robust enterprise network server architectures. She graduated from St. John’s University, from which she also holds an honorary doctorate; she also holds a M.S. in operations research from Rensselaer Polytechnic Institute. In 2018, St. John's University dedicated a new computer lab, called the Sanford Family Cyber Security Lab, in honor of Sanford and her family.

References

1953 births
Living people
American technology executives
IBM people
St. John's University (New York City) alumni
Rensselaer Polytechnic Institute alumni
Members of the United States National Academy of Engineering
American women business executives
21st-century American women